Lamb's Crossing (Manx: Crossag Eayn) is a stop on the Manx Electric Railway on the Isle of Man.

Location

The diminutive halt can be found on the descent from Garwick into the village of Laxey, and serves a residential community in the upper part of the valley.

Facilities

Being a little-used rural request stop, this halt has no passenger facilities but is marked by a traction pole-mounted totem sign.

Also
Manx Electric Railway Stations

References

Sources
 Manx Manx Electric Railway Stopping Places (2002) Manx Electric Railway Society
 Island Island Images: Manx Electric Railway Pages (2003) Jon Wornham
 Official Official Tourist Department Page (2009) Isle Of Man Heritage Railways

Railway stations in the Isle of Man
Manx Electric Railway
Railway stations opened in 1894